Otmar Hasler (born 28 September 1953) was the Prime Minister of Liechtenstein from 5 April 2001 to 25 March 2009.

Earlier life

He was educated at the University of Fribourg. Hasler served as President of the Landtag from January 1995 to December 1995.

Prime Minister of Liechtenstein

He was appointed on 5 April 2001, replacing Mario Frick, and led a government of the Progressive Citizens' Party in Liechtenstein and the Patriotic Union. His rule saw a significant transfer of powers from his office to the reigning Prince of Liechtenstein.

See also

 Politics of Liechtenstein

References

Heads of government of Liechtenstein
1953 births
Living people
Members of the Landtag of Liechtenstein
Speakers of the Landtag of Liechtenstein
Progressive Citizens' Party politicians
Patriotic Union (Liechtenstein) politicians
University of Fribourg alumni
People from Gamprin